Justifiers RPG is a role-playing game published by StarChilde in 1988.

Description
Justifiers RPG is a science-fiction space-adventure system in which player characters select from 28 humanoid animal types, including bats, albatrosses, gila monsters, and rhinos. The game features a skill-based system in which character class dictates what skills a character has. Skill resolution is by the simple percentage-roll method; combat is likewise fairly streamlined. There are rules for psionic powers, cybernetic implants, weapons, and spaceships. The background is of a future history in which megacorporations own entire worlds and are exploring the galaxy to find more systems to exploit. The "beta-humanoid" heroes work for the corporations. The game includes an introductory scenario.

Publication history
Justifiers RPG was designed by Gideon, with Blaine Pardoe, and published by StarChilde in 1988 as a 128-page book.  Several sourcebooks and a second edition of the core rulebook followed.

List of Justifiers RPG Books:

 Justifiers RPG 1st Edition - 1988
 Justifiers RPG 2nd Edition - 
 Aborigine Sourcebook
 The Corporate Sourcebook
 CyberMedTech Sourcebook
 The Hybrid Sourcebook - 
 The Silent Corp Sourcebook
 Cold as Ice
 Out of the Mists - 
 Poseidon - 
 The Insidious Campaign - 
 The Tower

At some point author Markus Heitz from Germany secured the rights to the Justifiers IP.  He proceeded to create a series of novels and short stories with other authors and well as a new edition of the game.

List of Markus Heitz' Justifier Series

Novels (in German):

 Justifiers - Collector - July 6, 2010 - 
 Justifiers - Collector: Operation Vade Retro - February 9, 2015 - 
 Christoph Hardebusch: Justifiers 1: Missing in Action
 Lena Falkenhagen: Justifiers 2: Undercover
 Thomas Finn: Justifiers 3: Mind Control
 Nicole Schuhmacher: Justifiers 4: Zero Gravity
 Boris Koch: Justifiers 5: Sabotage
 Daniela Knor: Justifiers 6: Outcast
 Thomas Plischke: Justifiers 7: Autopilot
 Maike Hallmann: Justifiers 8: Hard to kill - August 13, 2012 - 
 Christian von Aster: Justifiers 9: Robolution - December 10, 2012 - 
 Susan Schwartz: Justifiers 10: Unusual Suspects - March 11, 2013 - 

Graphic Novels (in German):

 Justifiers - Collector Band 2 - Automaton Prime - Markus Heitz, Hannes Radke, Jorg Krismann - January 14, 2014 - 
 Justifiers - Collector Band 3 - Die keeper - Markus Heitz, Hannes Radke, Jorg Krismann - January 1, 2018 - 

Roleplaying Books (in German:)

 Markus Heitz' Justifiers - Das Abenteuerspiel (The Adventure Game) - December - 
 Markus Heitz' Justifiers - Mystery

Reception
Justifiers RPG was reviewed in Space Gamer/Fantasy Gamer No. 88. The reviewer commented that "I think this is an excellent primer for beginning gamers. Its main focus is on small unit combat and inter-player conflict. This appears to be what most beginning gamers enjoy the most."

Lawrence Schick commented that Justifiers "takes 'Pets in Space' to its farthest extreme", and that "If you can get by that, you'll find a solid skill-based system".

Reviews
Reviews from R'lyeh 23 December 2018 http://rlyehreviews.blogspot.com/2018/12/1988-justifiers-rpg.html?m=1

References

Furry role-playing games
Role-playing games introduced in 1988
Science fiction role-playing games